Savage Gold is the third studio album from American metal band Tombs. It marks the groups first record to feature contributions from guitarist Garett Bussanick and bassist Ben Brand, as well as the first record to be produced by Erik Rutan.

Writing and composition
Material for the record was written by principal songwriters Mike Hill and Andrew Hernandez II over the span of three years following the release of Path of Totality. Hill has characterized the material as "darker and more extreme" than Path of Totality. Hill also stated that the instrumental interactions for the record are "straightforward and a little dryer" compared to previous releases, with the intention of increasing the impact of the lyrics and music.

Recording
Recording was completed by producer Erik Rutan at Mana Recording Studios. Hill described the recording process as "grueling", but effective in reaching the intended result. Rutan was said to be primarily focused on the technical aspects of recording while the band focused entirely on the creative aspects of the music.

Release and promotion
The album will be released on June 10, 2014, through Relapse Records in CD, 2XLP, deluxe 2XLP, and digital download formats. The track "Edge of Darkness" was made available for streaming on April 22, 2014, and was subsequently given the "Best New Track" distinction by Pitchfork writer Grayson Currin. On May 5, 2014, the track "Deathtripper" was made available for streaming via The A.V. Club.

Reception
Thus far, the album has been unanimously praised by music critics. The aggregate review site Metacritic assigned an average score of 85 out of 100 to the album based on 4 reviews, indicating "Universal Acclaim".

In a positive review, Dave Schalek of About.com named Savage Gold "their heaviest album to date." Commenting on the album's production, Pitchfork characterized the album's sound as a "...cohesive, propulsive, and definitive statement." Similarly, Joe Pelone of Punknews.org described the album as "pristine" and "decimating", concluding "It is, simply, the best Tombs record so far."

Track listing

Personnel
Savage Gold album credits adapted from Allmusic.

Tombs
 Mike Hill – guitar, electronics, vocals 
 Andrew Hernandez II – drums
 Garett Bussanick – guitar
 Ben Brand – bass, electronics

Additional personnel
 Sera Timms – guitar, vocals 
 J. Bennett – guitar, vocals 
 Erik Rutan – production, mixing
 Bryan – assistant engineer
 Alan Douches – mastering
 Thomas Hooper – album artwork

Charts

References

External links

2014 albums
Tombs (band) albums
Albums produced by Erik Rutan
Relapse Records albums